Solanum citrullifolium is a species of flowering plant in the Solanaceae family. It is a nightshade referred to by the common name watermelon nightshade, as its leaves somewhat resemble those of a watermelon plant. It is a white-stemmed shrub with purple star-shaped flowers. It is native to the southern United States and it is grown in home gardens as an ornamental plant.

Not to be confused with the similarly-named "melonleaf nightshade," which is a different species, S. heterodoxum.

References

Footnotes
  (2004):  – Solanum citrullifolium. Version of August 2004. Retrieved 2008-SEP-25.

External links

 Solanum citrullifolium info

citrullifolium
Taxa named by Alexander Braun